Lester Curtis Howe (August 24, 1895 – July 16, 1976) was a pitcher in Major League Baseball who played from 1923 through 1924 for the Boston Red Sox. He was born in Brooklyn, New York.

In a two-season career, Howe posted a 2–0 record with a 3.38 ERA in 16 appearances, including two starts, 10 strikeouts and nine walks in 37⅓ innings of work. 

Howe died in Woodmere, New York at age 80 of natural causes. A World War I veteran, he was buried at Long Island National Cemetery.

References

External links
Baseball Reference
Retrosheet

1895 births
1976 deaths
United States Army personnel of World War I
Boston Red Sox players
Farmingdale State Rams baseball players
Major League Baseball pitchers
People from Woodmere, New York
Sportspeople from Brooklyn
Baseball players from New York City
Burials at Long Island National Cemetery
Bridgeport Americans players
Hartford Senators players
Mobile Bears players
Waterbury Brasscos players